Copestylum is one of the largest genera of hoverflies in the Americas. It comprises more than 300 species, of which only four have been found outside the Americas, having probably been introduced by the importation of cacti in which the larvae live.

Taxonomy

Subgenera and type species
The following is a list of the subgenera within Copestylum, with just the type species of each subgenus listed afterwards.

 Subgenus Copestylum Macquart, 1846 – type Copestylum flaviventre Macquart, 1846
 Subgenus Phalacromyia Rondani, 1848 – type Copestylum submetallicum (Rondani, 1848)
 Subgenus Glaurotricha Thomson, 1869 – type Copestylum muscarium (Thomson, 1869)
 Subgenus Atemnocera Bigot, 1882a – type Copestylum scutellatum (Macquart, 1842)
 Subgenus Apophysophora Williston, 1888 – type Copestylum trituberculatum Thomson, 1976
 Subgenus Megametopon (= Ophromyia) Giglio-Tos, 1891 – type Copestylum nasicum (Williston, 1891)
 Subgenus Camerania Giglio-Tos, 1892a – type Copestylum macrocephalum (Giglio-Tos, 1892)   
 Subgenus Viereckomyia Curran, 1925b – type Copestylum gibberum (Schiner, 1868)
 Subgenus Lepidopsis Curran, 1925b – type Copestylum compactum (Curran, 1925)
 Subgenus Volosyrpha Shannon, 1929 – type Copestylum rufitarse Thomson, 1976
 Subgenus Volucellosia Curran, 1930d – type Copestylum fornax Townsend, 1895
 Subgenus Tachinosyrphus Hull, 1936b – type Copestylum pseudotachina (Hull, 1936)

Species
For a complete list of Copestylum species, see List of Copestylum species.

Notes

References

External links
 
 

Diptera of North America
Diptera of South America
Hoverfly genera
Eristalinae
Taxa named by Pierre-Justin-Marie Macquart